The 1998–99 Moldovan Cup was the eighth season of the Moldovan annual football cup competition. The competition ended with the final held on 27 May 1999.

Round of 16
The first legs were played on 15 March 1999. The second legs were played on 19 March 1999.

|}

Quarter-finals
The first legs were played on 7 April 1999. The second legs were played on 14 and 15 April 1999.

|}

Semi-finals
The first legs were played on 28 April 1999. The second legs were played on 13 May 1999.

|}

Final

References
 

Moldovan Cup seasons
Moldovan Cup
Moldova